Wodonga West Secondary was one of three public secondary schools educating Years 7-12 in Wodonga, Victoria. In 2006 it formally merged and pooled resources with the other two public secondary schools in Wodonga, Wodonga High School and Mitchell Secondary College. Wodonga West and Mitchell Secondary College became a combined college over two campuses, specialising in Years 7, 8 and 9, known as Wodonga Middle Years College, which is loosely associated with Wodonga Senior Secondary College. As of 2006, the former Wodonga West facility has become Wodonga Middle Years College Felltimber Campus.

Public high schools in Victoria (Australia)
Defunct schools in Victoria (Australia)
Wodonga